This list of disaster films represents over half a century of films within the genre. Disaster films are motion pictures which depict an impending or ongoing disaster as a central plot feature. The films typically feature large casts and multiple storylines and focus on the protagonists' attempts to avert, escape, or cope with the disaster presented.

Man-made disasters
 Ablaze (2001) 
 Backdraft (1991) 
 The Burning Sea (2021)
 City on Fire (1979) 
 Crack in the World  (1965)
 Dante's Inferno (1935) 
 Daylight (1996) 
 Deepwater Horizon (2016) 
 Fire! (1977) 
 Firestorm (1998) 
 In Old Chicago (1937) 
 Ladder 49 (2004) 
 Red Skies of Montana (1952) 
 The Tower (2012)  
 The Towering Inferno (1974)
 Trapped (2001)

Natural disasters

 10.0 Earthquake (2014) 
 10.5 (2004) 
 13 Minutes (2021) 
 2012 (film)  (2009)  
 After the Shock  (1990)
 Aftershock: Earthquake in New York (1999)
 Armageddon (1998) 
 Asteroid (1997)
 Avalanche (1978) 
  Beyond the Poseidon Adventure (1979)
 California Firestorm (2002) 
 Christmas Twister (2012) 
 The Core (2003) 
 Cyclone (1978) 
 Dante's Peak (1997) 
 The Day After Tomorrow (2004)
 Deep Impact  (1998)
 Deluge  (1933) "the first studio produced narrative disaster picture."
 Devil Winds (2003) 
 Disaster Zone: Volcano in New York (2006) 
 Earthquake (1974) 
 Earthquake in New York (1998) 
 Fire Twister (2015) 
 Flood (2007) 
 Flood: A River's Rampage (1997) 
 Flood! (1976) 
 Geostorm (2017) 
 The Great Los Angeles Earthquake (1990) 
 Greenland (2020) 
 Hard Rain (1998) 
 Heatwave! (1974) 
 The Hurricane (1937) 
 Hurricane (1979) 
 The Impossible (2012) 
 Into the Storm (2014) 
 Killer Flood: The Day the Dam Broke (2003) 
 Krakatoa, East of Java (1969) 
 Magma: Volcanic Disaster (2006) 
 Meteor  (1979) 
 Nature Unleashed: Avalanche (2004) 
 Nature Unleashed: Earthquake (2005) 
 Nature Unleashed: Fire (2004) 
 Nature Unleashed: Tornado (2005) 
 Night of the Twisters (1996) 
 NYC: Tornado Terror (2008) 
 The Night the World Exploded  (1957)
 On Hostile Ground (2000) 
 The Perfect Storm (2000) 
 Pompeii (2014)
 Poseidon (2006)
 The Poseidon Adventure (1972)
 The Quake (film) (2018) 
 The Rains Came (1939) 
 Raise the Titanic (1980) 
 San Andreas  (2015)
 San Francisco  (1936)
 Seattle Superstorm (2012) 
 S.O.S. Titanic (1979) 
 St. Helens (1981) 
 Super Cyclone (2012) 
 Storm (1999) 
 Tidal Wave (1973) 
 Tidal Wave (2009)
 Tidal Wave: No Escape (1997) 
 Titanic (1953) 
 Titanic (1996) 
 Titanic (1997) 
 Titanic: The Legend Goes On (2001) 
 Tornado! (1996) 
 Tornado Warning (2002) 
 Twister (1996) 
 Tycus  (1998) 
 Volcano: Fire on the Mountain (1997) 
 Volcano (1997) 
 The Volcano Disaster (also known as Nature Unleashed: Volcano, 2005) 
 War of the Worlds (2005)      
 The Wave (2015)
 When Time Ran Out (1980)

End of days

 The Day After (1983)
 When Worlds Collide (1951)

Airplanes

Airport (film series), 1970s series of four airplane-themed disaster films
Airport (1970 film), a film based on Arthur Hailey's book
Airport 1975, sequel to the 1970 film
Airport '77, sequel to Airport 1975
The Concorde ... Airport '79, 1979 sequel to Airport '77
Airspeed (1998) 
 Alive  (1993)
 The Doomsday Flight (1966) 
 Fire and Rain (1989) 
 The Flight of the Phoenix (1965) 
Flight of the Phoenix (2004) 
The High and the Mighty  (1954)
 The Hindenburg (1975)  
 Snakes on a Plane (2006)
 Survive! (1976)
 Turbulence  (1997) 
 Zero Hour! (1957)

The atomic age
 Atomic Train  (1999) 
 Atomic Twister (2002) 
 Control (1987) 
 Miracle Mile (1988) 
 Friend of the World (2020) 
 On the Beach (1959) 
 Panic in Year Zero! (1962)

Epidemics and pandemics
 The Andromeda Strain (1971) 
 The Cassandra Crossing (1976) 
 Contagion (2011) 
 Outbreak (1995) 
 Perfect Sense (2011) 
 Plague (1979) 
 The Stand (1994) 
 Virus (1980) 
 Virus (1995) 
 Warning Sign (1985)

Shipwrecks
 Beyond the Poseidon Adventure (1979) 
 Britannic (2000) 
 The Finest Hours (2016)
 Gray Lady Down (1978) 
 K-19: The Widowmaker (2002) 
 The Last Voyage (1960) 
 The Poseidon Adventure (1972) 
 The Poseidon Adventure (2005) 
 Poseidon (2006) 
 Raise the Titanic (1980) 
 S.O.S. Titanic (1979) 
 Titanic (1953) 
 Titanic (1996) 
 Titanic (1997) 
 Titanic: The Legend Goes On (2001) 
 Voyage to the Bottom of the Sea (1961) 
 A Night to Remember (1958)

See also
 Apocalyptic and post-apocalyptic fiction
 Cultural significance of tornadoes § Motion pictures with a tornado theme
 List of apocalyptic films
 List of firefighting films
 List of monster movies
 List of natural horror films
 Survival film
 List of zombie films

References

Further reading
 
 

Disaster
Disasters